Richard Stanyhurst (1547–1618) was an Anglo-Irish alchemist, translator, poet and historian, who was born in Dublin.

Life
His father, James Stanyhurst, was Recorder of Dublin, and Speaker of the Irish House of Commons in 1557, 1560 and 1568. His grandfather was Nicholas Stanihurst, Mayor of Dublin in 1543. His mother was Anne Fitzsimon, daughter of Thomas Fitzsimon, Recorder of Dublin. Richard was sent to Peter White's Kilkenny College after which, in 1563, he continued to University College, Oxford, where he took his degree five years later. At Oxford, he became intimate with Edmund Campion. After leaving the university he studied law at Furnival's Inn and Lincoln's Inn. He contributed in 1587 to Holinshed's Chronicles "a playne and perfecte description" of Ireland, and a History of Ireland during the reign of Henry VIII, which were severely criticized in Barnabe Rich's New Description of Ireland (1610) as a misrepresentation of Irish affairs written from the English standpoint. They also caused offence to Catholics for their anti-Catholic perspective. After the death of his wife, Janet Barnewall, daughter of Sir Christopher Barnewall (whom he praised warmly in his contribution to Holinshed), in 1579, Stanyhurst went to the Netherlands. After his second marriage, which took place before 1585, to Helen Copley, he became active in the Catholic cause. He lived in the bishopric of Liège, where he got in touch with the Paracelsan movement gathered around Ernest of Bavaria (1554–1612). From then, Stanihurst analysed the relationships between medicine and chemistry.

In the early 1590s, he was invited to Spain by King Philip II, who became seriously ill. Stanihurst worked at the great alchemical laboratory in El Escorial. At the same time, he informed the state of Catholics' interest in England. After his wife's death in 1602 he took holy orders, and became chaplain to the Archduke Albert of Austria in the Netherlands. He had two sons, Peter and William Stanyhurst, both of whom became Jesuits.

He never returned to England, and died at Brussels, according to Anthony à Wood.

Works
Stanihurst translated into English The First Foure Bookes of Virgil his Aeneis (Leiden, 1582), to give practical proof of the feasibility of Gabriel Harvey's theory that classical rules of prosody could be successfully applied to English poetry. The translation is an unconscious burlesque of the original in a jargon arranged in what the writer called hexameters. Thomas Nashe in his preface to Greene's Menaphon ridiculed this performance as his
"heroicall poetrie, infired ... with an hexameter furie
 a patterne whereof I will propounde to your judgements.
 Then did he make heaven's vault to rebounde, with rounce robble hobble
 Of ruffe raffe roaring, with thwick thwack thurlery bouncing." 
This is a parody, but not a very extravagant one, of Stanyhurst's vocabulary and metrical methods.

Only two copies of the original Leiden edition of Stanyhurst's translation of Virgil are known to be in existence. In this edition, his orthographical cranks are preserved. A reprint in 1583 by Henry Bynneman forms the basis of James Maidment's edition (Edinburgh, 1836), and of Edward Arber's reprint (1880), which contains an excellent introduction. Stanyhurst's Latin works include De rebus in Hibernia gestis (Antwerp, 1584) and a life of St Patrick (1587).

A new edition of Stanihurst's controversial Latin history of Ireland was created in 2013 by Hiram Morgan and John Barry for Cork University Press under the title, Great Deeds in Ireland: Richard Stanihurst's De Rebus in Hibernia Gestis. This work is a product of the Centre for Neo-Latin Studies at University College Cork.

References

Further reading
Colm Lennon, Richard Stanihurst the Dubliner, 1547-1618: A Biography, with a Stanihurst Text, on Ireland's Past, Dublin: Irish Academic Press, 1981.
Colm Lennon, "Richard Stanihurst," The Dictionary of Literary Biography, Volume 281: British Rhetoricians and Logicians, 1500–1660, Second Series, Detroit: Gale, 2003, pp. 296–303.
Colm Lennon, "Richard Stanihurst and Old English Identity," Irish Historical Studies, vol. 21, 1978, pp. 121–143.
Colm Lennon, "Richard Stanihurst's 'Spanish Catholicism': Ideology and Diplomacy in Brussels and Madrid," Irland y la monarcquía Hispánica: Kinsale 1601-2001, Madrid, 2002, pp. 75–88.
John Barry & Hiram Morgan, Great Deeds in Ireland: Richard Stanihurst's De Rebus in Hibernia Gestis, Cork, Cork University Press, 2013.

External links

 The Alchemical Works of Richard Stanyhurst
 

1547 births
1618 deaths
Irish poets
Irish alchemists
Irish non-fiction writers
Irish male non-fiction writers
Alumni of University College, Oxford
People educated at Kilkenny College
People from County Dublin
People of Elizabethan Ireland
16th-century Irish poets
17th-century Irish poets
16th-century Irish writers
17th-century Irish writers
16th-century alchemists
17th-century alchemists
17th-century Irish historians
Translators of Virgil
Holinshed's Chronicles